The Scientists are a post-punk band from Perth, Western Australia, led by Kim Salmon, initially known as the Exterminators and then the Invaders. The band had two primary incarnations: the Perth-based punk band of the late 1970s and the Sydney/London-based swamp rock band of the 1980s.

In October 2010, Blood Red River (1983) was included in the list in the book 100 Best Australian Albums.

History

1976–1977: formation
Kim Salmon had formed a punk band, the Cheap Nasties, in August 1976. He left in December 1977 and the remainder, with Robbie Porritt joining as lead vocalist, continued as the Manikins. Salmon replaced Mark Demetrius in the Exterminators, who then became known as the Invaders. The lineup included Roddy Radalj (guitar, vocals), Boris Sujdovic (bass) and John Rowlings (drums).

1978–1981: Perth
The Invaders became the Scientists in May 1978, when James Baker from the Victims replaced Rowlings. Sujdovic left the band in August 1978 (later recording with the Rockets). The songwriting partnership that ensued, with Baker writing lyrics which Salmon would put to music, naturally favoured a melodic, pop-infused style of punk.

The band started playing again in January 1979 with Dennis Byrne on bass. This lineup recorded the band's first single, "Frantic Romantic"/"Shake (Together Tonight)", released in June 1979 on the D.N.A. Records label.

Radalj and Byrne left in April 1979, replaced by Ben Juniper (guitar) and Ian Sharples (bass). This lineup recorded the band's second release, The Scientists EP (released February 1980 by White Rider Records) and did two tours of Melbourne and Sydney, in December 1979 and February/March 1980. In Melbourne, the band appeared on pop TV show Countdown, performing "Last Night" from the EP.

Juniper left the band in May 1980, and Salmon, Baker and Sharples continued as a trio. The band broke up in January 1981 after recording their debut album, The Scientists (commonly referred to as The Pink Album), released in August 1981 by EMI Custom Records. In Sydney, Baker had joined Radalj to form Le Hoodoo Gurus with Dave Faulkner (ex-the Victims) and Kimble Rendall in January 1981.

Salmon then formed Louie Louie with Kim Williams (bass) and Brett Rixon (drums), though this band broke up in August 1981.

1982–1987: Sydney and London
In September 1981, Salmon and Sujdovic reformed the band, with Rixon on drums and Tony Thewlis (ex-Helicopters) on guitar, and prepared to move to Sydney. For this version of the band, the musical direction of the band turned more towards swampy, psychedelic-tinged rock and roll, incorporating the influence of bands such as The Gun Club, the Cramps, Suicide, the Stooges and Captain Beefheart.

The band was signed by Au Go Go Records, who released "This Is My Happy Hour"/"Swampland" (December 1982), the influential Blood Red River mini-LP (September 1983) and "We Had Love"/"Clear Spot" (December 1983).

By the end of 1983, the Scientists were one of the most popular Australian independent bands. Deciding to move on to new horizons, they left Australia and relocated to London in March 1984. In October 1984, the band supported the Gun Club on their European tour. Meanwhile, Au Go Go had issued the darker, harsher mini-album This Heart Doesn't Run on Blood, This Heart Doesn't Run on Love (September 1984).

The band released a 12" EP, Demolition Derby, in Belgium in February 1985, and their first full overseas album Produced by The Fall and Birthday Party producer, Richard Mazda , You Get What You Deserve, in the UK in July 1985 on their manager's Karbon label, followed by the "You Only Live Twice"/"If It's The Last Thing I Do" 7" in September. Owing to contractual disputes with Au Go Go, different mixes of some tracks appeared in Australia as the mini-album Atom Bomb Baby, with the "Atom Bomb Baby/Backwards Man" 7" and a compilation LP Heading For a Trauma (comprising Demolition Derby with rare, radio and live tracks) being released with it in July 1985.

Rixon left the band in February 1985 to be replaced by Phillip Hertz, who was replaced in December 1985 by Leanne Chock. The band signed a new deal with Big Time Records, who asked them to prepare a best-of compilation to introduce them to the market. The band rerecorded 11 of their songs with producer Richard Mazda as Weird Love, released in April 1986.

Sujdovic had to leave the UK after the recording due to visa problems, and was replaced by Joe Presedo of Silver Chapter. Presedo and Chock left in December 1986, Salmon shifted to bass and Nick Combe joined on drums. The Salmon/Thewlis/Combe lineup recorded the album Human Jukebox in December 1986.

This lineup returned to Australia in April 1987 for the Human Jukebox tour. Salmon moved back to Perth with his wife Linda Fearon (co-writer of "Blood Red River") and son. Human Jukebox was released on Karbon in October 1987. The band toured Australia in November 1987, with a lineup of Salmon, Thewlis, Combe on drums and Rixon rejoining on bass. Their last show was at the Shenton Park Hotel in Perth on 27 November 1987.

1987–2006: after the Scientists
In Perth between the 1987 tours, Salmon formed Kim Salmon and the Surrealists with Brian Hooper on bass and Tony Pola on drums. He lived in Perth until the early 1990s, playing live solo, with the Surrealists or with "Kim Salmon's Human Jukebox", formed with Kim Williams and Pola to promote the 1991 Scientists compilation Absolute. He also played with the second incarnation of the Beasts of Bourbon from 1988 until 1993. Salmon's music continued in a similar direction to his work with the Scientists.

After the Scientists, Thewlis formed the Interstellar Villains, exploring a musical direction much more rooted in '60s rock, psychedelia and surf music. He then joined Diggory Kenrick and Robert Coyne in Venus Ray, and later played with the Scoundrelles.

2006–present: reformation
In May 2006, the Scientists (with a line-up of Thewlis, Salmon, Sujdovic and Chock) were invited by Mudhoney to play at the All Tomorrow's Parties festival in the UK. They also supported Mudhoney at a performance at Shepherd's Bush Empire in London on 11 May 2006. In 2007, a live recording of that performance, Sedition, was released on the ATP Recordings label. The same lineup played in London in April 2007 and at the ATP festival the same month. In February 2008, they supported Sonic Youth for their Australian Daydream Nation shows, performing the mini album Blood Red River in its entirety as part of the ATP-curated Don't Look Back series.

In September 2010, the group played their first ever U.S. show at the ATP New York music festival in Monticello, where they performed Blood Red River in its entirety.  

In 2018 and 2019 the Scientists (with a line-up of Salmon, Cowie (née Chock), Sujdovic and Thewlis) toured in Europe and North America, and said that they would soon release a new recording.

In April 2021, the band confirmed the release of a new studio album titled Negativity scheduled for June 2021 and released single "Outsiders". "I Wasn't Good at Picking Friends" was released in May 2021.

The 2021 line-up features singer-guitarist Kim Salmon, lead guitarist Tony Thewlis, drummer Leanne Cowie and bassist Boris Sujdovic.

Use in film
The song "Last Night" was used in Corey Duffel's part in the Foundation Skateboards' movie That's Life, and the song "We Had Love" was used in the movie RocknRolla.

Discography

Studio albums

Live albums

Compilation albums

Extended plays

Singles

Awards

West Australian Music Industry Awards
The West Australian Music Industry Awards are annual awards celebrating achievements for Western Australian music. They commenced in 1985.

|-
| 2019 || The Scientists|| Hall of Fame || 
|-

References

External links
ATP Recordings Page
Kim Salmon interview (Noise For Heroes)
www.perthpunk.com, which contains an extensive history of the earliest Perth punk rock scene, including references to The Cheap Nasties, Kim Salmon, Victims, Geeks, Manikins, Dave Warner and Pus, and written contributions by Rod Radalj and Mark Demetrius.
www.fromthearchives.org, which has a complete discography.

1978 establishments in Australia
Musical groups established in 1978
Musical groups reestablished in 2007
Punk blues musical groups
Musical groups from Perth, Western Australia
Sympathy for the Record Industry artists
Australian punk rock groups
Australian alternative rock groups
Timberyard Records artists
Au Go Go Records artists